Paracuris bimaculata is a species of beetle in the family Buprestidae, the only species in the genus Paracuris.

References

Monotypic Buprestidae genera